Wolmar  Onni Schildt  (3 July 1851 – 23 April 1913) was a Finnish politician. He was a member of the Senate of Finland and an agricultural extension practitioner.

Schildt was born in Jyväskylä. His parents were District doctor Wolmar Styrbjörn Schildt-Kilpinen and Mathilda Fredrika Wilhelmina Wadenstjerna. She graduated in 1870 and attended the Alnarp Agricultural College in 1875. Schildt was the head of the dairy and animal husbandry school in Hovila from 1879 to 1903, an inspector of the Mikkeli Provincial Offices 1889–1899, and a Senate Finance Officer, Senator and Head of Agriculture, Mechelin and Hjelt in 1905–1909.

He owned Hovila manor in Sysmä in 1876–1913.

Schildt was a member of the Knights and Jury in 1882, 1885, 1894, 1897, 1899 and 1904–1906 in the State of Legislature. [1] He was the supervisor of the Agricultural Association of East Häme and of the Mikkeli County Agricultural Society.

Onni Schildt married Mathilda Natalia Fredrika Tigerstedt in 1876.

1851 births
1913 deaths
People from Jyväskylä
People from Vaasa Province (Grand Duchy of Finland)
Young Finnish Party politicians
Finnish senators
Members of the Diet of Finland